Pneumonic plague is a severe lung infection caused by the bacterium Yersinia pestis. Symptoms include fever, headache, shortness of breath, chest pain, and coughing. They typically start about three to seven days after exposure. It is one of three forms of plague, the other two being septicemic plague and bubonic plague.

The pneumonic form may occur following an initial bubonic or septicemic plague infection. It may also result from breathing in airborne droplets from another person or animal infected with pneumonic plague. The difference between the forms of plague is the location of infection; in pneumonic plague the infection is in the lungs, in bubonic plague the lymph nodes, and in septicemic plague within the blood. Diagnosis is by testing the blood, sputum, or fluid from a lymph node.

While vaccines are being developed, in most countries they are not yet commercially available. Prevention is by avoiding contact with infected rodents, people, or cats. It is recommended that those infected be isolated from others. Treatment of pneumonic plague is with antibiotics.

Plague is present among rodents in Africa, the Americas, and Asia. Pneumonic plague is more serious and less common than bubonic plague. The total reported number of cases of all types of plague in 2013 was 783. Left untreated, pneumonic plague is always fatal. Some hypothesize that the pneumonic version of the plague was mainly responsible for the Black Death that resulted in approximately 75 - 200 million deaths in the 1300s.

Signs and symptoms
The most apparent symptom of pneumonic plague is coughing, often with hemoptysis (coughing up blood). With pneumonic plague, the first signs of illness are fever, headache, weakness and rapidly developing pneumonia with shortness of breath, chest pain, cough and sometimes bloody or watery sputum.

The pneumonia progresses for two to four days and may cause respiratory failure and shock. Patients will die without early treatment, some within 36 hours.

Initial pneumonic plague symptoms can often include the following:
 Fever
 Weakness
 Headaches
 Nausea

Rapidly developing pneumonia with:
 Shortness of breath
 Chest pain
 Cough
 Bloody or watery sputum (saliva and discharge from respiratory passages).

Causes
Pneumonic plague can be caused in two ways: primary, which results from the inhalation of aerosolized plague bacteria, or secondary, when septicemic plague spreads into lung tissue from the bloodstream. Pneumonic plague is not exclusively vector-borne like bubonic plague; instead, it can be spread from person to person. There have been cases of pneumonic plague resulting from the dissection or handling of contaminated animal tissue. This is one of the types of plague formerly known as the Black Death.

Treatment
Pneumonic plague is a very aggressive infection requiring early treatment, which must be given within 24 hours of first symptoms to reduce the risk of death. Streptomycin, gentamicin, tetracyclines and chloramphenicol are all able to kill the causative bacterium.

Antibiotic treatment for seven days will protect people who have had direct, close contact with infected patients. Wearing a close-fitting surgical mask also protects against infection.

The mortality rate from untreated pneumonic plague approaches 100%.

Modern outbreaks
Since 2002, the World Health Organization (WHO) has reported seven plague outbreaks, though some may go unreported because they often happen in remote areas. Between 1998 and 2009, nearly 24,000 cases have been reported, including about 2,000 deaths, in Africa, Asia, the Americas, and Eastern Europe. Ninety-eight percent of the world's cases occur in Africa.

Democratic Republic of the Congo
Two outbreaks occurred in the Democratic Republic of the Congo in 2005 and 2006. The outbreak in 2005 was only detected by looking back at blood samples.

India

In September 1994, India experienced an outbreak of plague that killed 50 and caused travel to New Delhi by air to be suspended until the outbreak was brought under control. The outbreak was feared to be much worse because the plague superficially resembles other common diseases such as influenza and bronchitis; over 200 people that had been quarantined were released when they did not test positive for the plague. All but two of the deaths occurred around the city of Surat.

China
A major outbreak of the pneumonic plague occurred in Manchuria from 1910 to 1911, in what became known as the Manchurian plague, killing around 60,000 people. The Qing court dispatched Wu Lien-teh, a doctor educated at Cambridge University, to oversee disease control and treatment efforts. He made the novel observation that the disease was transmitted by air, and developed prototypical respirators to help prevent its spread. A second, less deadly outbreak occurred in 1920–21, killing approximately 9,300 people.

The People's Republic of China has eradicated pneumonic plague from most parts of the country, but still reports occasional cases in remote western areas, where the disease is carried by rats and the marmots that live across the Himalayan plateau. Outbreaks can be caused when a person eats an infected marmot or comes into contact with fleas carried by rats. A 2006 WHO report from an international meeting on plague cited a Chinese government disease expert as saying that most cases of the plague in China's northwest occur when hunters are contaminated while skinning infected animals.

The expert said at the time that, due to the region's remoteness, the disease killed more than half the infected people. The report also said that since the 1990s, there was a rise in plague cases in humans—from fewer than 10 in the 1980s to nearly 100 cases in 1996 and 254 in 2000. In September 2008, two people in East Tibet died of pneumonic plague.

An outbreak of the disease in China began in August 2009 in Ziketan Town located in Qinghai Province. The town was sealed off and several people died as a result of the disease. According to spokesperson Vivian Tan of the WHO office in Beijing, "In cases like this [in August 2009], we encourage the authorities to identify cases, to investigate any suspicious symptoms among close contacts, and to treat confirmed cases as soon as possible. So far, they have done exactly that. There have been sporadic cases reported around the country in the last few years so the authorities do have the experience to deal with this."

In September 2010, five cases of pneumonic plague were reported in Tibet.

In July 2014, Chinese media reported one case found in Gansu.

On 12 November 2019, It was announced that two people from the Chinese province of Inner Mongolia were diagnosed with pneumonic plague. They received treatment in Chaoyang District, Beijing, and authorities implemented preventative control measures. Later in November, a third case of plague was confirmed. A 55-year-old man was diagnosed with bubonic plague after eating wild rabbit in Inner Mongolia. The region's health commission says it has no evidence to suggest that this case is linked to the previous two. By the end of November, a fourth case was confirmed. Chinese health authorities reported a fresh case of bubonic plague in the country's northern Inner Mongolia region, bringing the total number of reported plague cases originating from Inner Mongolia to four.

Peru
In August 2010, Peru's health minister Oscar Ugarte announced that an outbreak of plague had killed a 14-year-old boy and had infected at least 31 people in a northern coastal province. The boy died of bubonic plague on 26 July 2010. Ugarte stated that authorities were screening sugar and fish meal exports from Ascope Province, located about 325 miles (520 km) northwest of Lima, not far from the popular Chicama beach. Most of the infections in Peru were bubonic plague, with four cases of pneumonic plague.

The first recorded plague outbreak in Peru was in 1903. Prior to the above case, the last known outbreak was in 1994, killing 35 people.

Madagascar

In November 2013, an outbreak of plague occurred in the African island nation of Madagascar. As of 16 December, at least 89 people were infected, with 39 deaths with at least two cases involving pneumonic plague. However, as many as 90% of cases were later reported to have involved pneumonic plague.

From 23 August to 30 September 2017, a total of 73 suspected, probable, and confirmed cases of pneumonic plague, including 17 deaths, were reported in Madagascar. The diagnosis was confirmed by the Institut Pasteur de Madagascar by a polymerase chain reaction test, while field health workers used a Rapid Diagnostic Test. The WHO and Institut Pasteur de Madagascar were both involved in administering antibiotic compounds and attempting to stop the spread of the disease. By mid-October, there were an estimated 684 confirmed cases of plague with 474 pneumonic, 156 bubonic and one septicemic. The remainder were not classified. At least 74 deaths have been ascribed to pneumonic plague.

The outbreak officially ended on 26 November 2017 with 2,348 cases and 202 deaths officially reported.

United States
In the fall of 1924, an outbreak occurred in Los Angeles that killed 30 people.

On 2 November 2007, wildlife biologist Eric York died of pneumonic plague in Grand Canyon National Park. York was exposed to the bacteria while conducting a necropsy on a cougar carcass.

In 2014, the Colorado Department of Public Health and Environment confirmed that a Colorado man had been diagnosed with pneumonic plague, the first confirmed human case in Colorado in more than 10 years, and one of only 60 cases since 1957. The man was found to have the disease after the family dog died unexpectedly and a necropsy revealed that the disease was the cause. Three additional pneumonic plague cases were confirmed in Colorado before the outbreak ended.

References

External links

 
 Frequently Asked Questions | Plague | CDC. Centers for Disease Control and Prevention.

Insect-borne diseases
Plague (disease)
Zoonotic bacterial diseases
Wikipedia medicine articles ready to translate
Wikipedia emergency medicine articles ready to translate